Constantin Cheianu (born 21 September 1959 in Truşeni, Strășeni) is a writer, playwright, prose writer, publicist, actor and TV anchor and journalist from the Republic of Moldova. As a dramaturg at the National Theatre in Chişinău, he adapted multiple novels for the stage. In 1993, together with the movie director Alexandru Vasilache  he became co-founder of the Pocket Theatre. Together with Anatol Durbala he leads the show "Ora de Ras"at Jurnal TV.

After graduating from the Faculty of Letters of the Moldova State University in Chișinău (1982), he became the editor of "Literatura și Arta" newspaper, where he starts with the short novel "Roua nouă".

Biography
Constantin Cheianu was born on 21 September 1959 in Truşeni. He studied philology at Moldova State University before working as an author and editor for newspapers, magazines and radio. He has written about ten plays performed in Moldova and Romania. He worked for Literatura şi Arta, Contrafort, Sud-Est (magazine), Jurnal de Chişinău, Timpul de dimineaţă, Ministry of Culture (Moldova).

Awards
 1998 an Award for Dramaturgy  given by the Writers’ Union of Moldova for the “Luminist” book 
 1999 the Award for Prose given by  Writers’ Union of Moldova  “Totul despre mine” (All about me) book
 2008 Grand Prix for the play “ Luna la Monkberry” (The moon at Mokberry)
 Grand Prize at the National Drama Festival

Works
 "Totul despre mine", 1999
 „Sex & Perestroika”, Editura „Cartier”, 2009

References

External links 
 Timpul de dimineaţă, Constantin Cheianu
 Cheianu Constantin 

1959 births
Actors from Chișinău
Moldova State University alumni
Moldovan male actors
Writers from Chișinău
Moldovan male writers
Moldovan journalists
Male journalists
Living people